Gloucester City Hall is located at 9 Dale Avenue in Gloucester, Massachusetts.  It was built in 1870 and dedicated the following year, and has served as the main location for the city's offices since then.  Built to a design by Bryant and Rogers, it is a two-story Second Empire brick building.  Each of the rectangular building's four corners is topped by its own pyramidal roof structure, above which is a small rectangular cupola with its own roof.  Centered on the front elevation is a clock tower that is brick in its lower levels, and decorated wood above, ending in a copper dome.

The building was listed on the National Register of Historic Places in 1973, and included in the Central Gloucester Historic District in 1982.

See also
National Register of Historic Places listings in Gloucester, Massachusetts
National Register of Historic Places listings in Essex County, Massachusetts

References

External links
 Website about the building

Government buildings completed in 1871
City and town halls on the National Register of Historic Places in Massachusetts
Buildings and structures in Gloucester, Massachusetts
City halls in Massachusetts
Clock towers in Massachusetts
National Register of Historic Places in Essex County, Massachusetts
Historic district contributing properties in Massachusetts
1870 establishments in Massachusetts